Aonach air Chrith (1,020 m) is a mountain in the Northwest Highlands, Scotland. It is located on the southern side of Glen Shiel in Kintail.

The mountain is the highest peak on a long ridge of seven Munros, which is known to climbers as the South Glen Shiel Ridge Walk.

References

Mountains and hills of the Northwest Highlands
Marilyns of Scotland
Munros
One-thousanders of Scotland